Ougenweide was a German progressive rock band. They are notable for being pioneers of the medieval folk rock subgenre. The name comes from Middle High German ougenweide (Augenweide - feast for the eyes).

Band history

The beginning 
The predecessor band was formed in 1969; it was composed of Frank Wulff, Michael Steinbeck, Jürgen Isenbart, and Brigitte Blunck. Ougenweide was founded in spring 1970 in Hamburg as a folk rock band. The band is named after a song by Neidhart von Reuental, the first joint composition by Ougenweide. From the beginning the band wanted to set to music old poems and songs, but they never completely restricted themselves to the Medieval. The band was influenced by the Rock music scene of Hamburg of the 1960s.

Successful years 
The second album of Ougenweide All die weil ich mag from 1974 used texts from the Merseburg Incantations. This sound recording of the Merseburger Zaubersprüche was covered later by many bands, including Die Irrlichter, who were awarded a prize in the 5th Falkensteiner Minnesangturnier by Ougenweide (who served as patrons and jury) in 2010, and by the medieval metal group In Extremo. The music is often incorrectly thought to originate in the Middle Ages, but goes back to Ougenweide. They also used texts or text-fragments by Walther von der Vogelweide, Heinrich von Mügeln and Johann Wolfgang Goethe.
1975 Ougenweide appeared on stage with Fairport Convention, Steeleye Span, Planxty, Amazing Blondel, Alan Stivell and Konstantin Wecker. They worked together with Peter Rühmkorf for a film about the life of Walther von der Vogelweide.

The split and reunions 
After struggling with musical direction, Ougenweide gave their last performances early in 1985 before splitting up.  Then, with the Tessera string quartet and the a cappella quintet Time Of Roses, they briefly reunited in 1996 to record "Sol", an album of covers of old European medieval folk songs.  But after only giving sporadic performances, they split up again.  The classic lineup reunited in 2004 to give a one-off hour performance  and then the band reunited two years after with several new members afterwards.  Frank Wulff stopped performing with the group in 2009 due to suffering from cancer, however he did record one more album with the group in 2010, Herzsprung, before passing away prior to the album's release.  The group briefly carried on without him but hasn't performed since 2011.

Discography

Studio albums 
 Ougenweide, 1973
 All die weil ich mag, 1974
 Ohrenschmaus, 1976
 Eulenspiegel, 1976
 Frÿheit, 1978
 Ousflug, 1979
 Ja-Markt, 1980
 Noch aber ist April, 1981
 Sol, 1996
 Herzsprung, 2010

Live albums 
 Ungezwungen, 1977, 2007
 Wol mich der Stunde, 2004
 Ouwe war, 2005

Compilations 
 Liederbuch Ougenweide, 1979, 1988
 Lieder aus 9 Jahrhunderten, 1983
 Ougenweide / All die weil ich mag, 2006
 Ohrenschmaus / Eulenspiegel, 2006
 Walther von der Vogelweide - Saget mir ieman: waz ist Minne?, 2007
 Frÿheit / Ousflug, 2007
 Ja-Markt / Noch aber ist April, 2007

References 

Medieval folk rock groups
German progressive rock groups